Arif Valiyev Mikayil oglu was an Azerbaijani politician who served as the Chairman of the State Statistics Committee of Azerbaijan Republic.

Early life
Valiyev was born on June 28, 1943, in Hasansu village of Agstafa District, Azerbaijan. In 1971, he graduated from the Azerbaijan State Economic University.

Political career
In May 1993, Valiyev was appointed the Chairman of the State Statistics Committee of Azerbaijan Republic, the post which he has held to this day.

He was married and has two sons.
He died in Baku in 2014 after a long illness.

See also
Cabinet of Azerbaijan

References 

1943 births
2014 deaths
People from Aghstafa District
Government ministers of Azerbaijan
Burials at II Alley of Honor